Austroboletus rarus is a species of bolete fungus in the family Boletaceae. Found in Singapore and Australia, it was described as new to science by E.J.H. Corner in 1972, who called it Boletus rarus. Corner found the type collection growing on a forest floor in Bukit Timah in December 1940. He suggested that it might be a variety of Boletus rubiicolor (now Austroboletus rubiicolor). Egon Horak transferred it to the genus Austroboletus in 1980.

Description

The surface is somewhat tomentose, but especially so near the cap center. The flesh is thick and white, measuring 2–2.5 mm thick. There is white mycelium at the base of the stipe. Its spores measure 16–21 by 8–10 µm.

The Japanese species Porphyrellus fusisporus is similar in appearance but can be distinguished by its shorter, warted spores that measure 13.5–18.5 µm.

References

External links

rarus
Fungi described in 1972
Fungi of Asia
Fungi native to Australia